2018 UA is a small near-Earth Apollo asteroid that flew very close to the earth on 19 October 2018. It was discovered about 90 minutes before closest approach. After A106fgF, it was probably the second closest non-impacting approach of an asteroid in 2018.

External links
 Asteroid 2018 UA flew past Earth at 0.04 LD, 4th closest on record 
 Truck-size asteroid makes fourth-closest pass by Earth on record
 Small asteroid passed closer than TV satellites
 MPEC 2018-U19 : 2018 UA Minor Planet Center
 
 
 

Minor planet object articles (unnumbered)
Near-Earth objects in 2018
Astronomical objects discovered in 2018